

Season summary 

Trabzonspor didn't have a successful season in 2002-03 coming 7th in the table. But Trabzonspor won the Turkish Cup.

Squad

Table

Scorers

Hat-tricks

Turkish Cup

Fourth round

Semifinal

Final

Notes

External links
Trabzonspor 2002 

Turkish football clubs 2002–03 season
Trabzonspor seasons